Red Bull Ghana was a Ghanaian professional football club and academy based in Sogakope, South Tongu District, Ghana, which was founded in 2008 and abolished in 2014. The club was owned by Red Bull and last played in Division One League Zone 3B.

History
Founded in 2008, the academy associated with the team has gone on to produce coaches and players alike. The team reached the second highest league in Ghana in 2009. Red Bull Ghana was relegated to Division Two in 2013. In August 2014 Red Bull abolished the academy and the club and it was merged with Feyenoord Academy to West African Football Academy.

Red Bull Ghana U17s lost 2–3 on penalties in the final of an International Tournament in Croix, France.

Head coaches
 Daniel Heidemann   2008-2010
 Henrik Pedersen 2010
 Eelco Schattorie 2011–12
 Sipke Hulshoff 2012–14

Technical director 

  Petrus In 't Groen 2010-2014

Notable former players
Abubakar Yakubu
Abdul-Aziz Yakubu
Gideon Mensah
Samuel Tetteh
Samuel Owusu
Felix Adjei
Patrick Twumasi
Lawrence Ati-Zigi

References

 
Association football clubs established in 2008
Football clubs in Ghana
Red Bull sports teams
2008 establishments in Ghana
Volta Region
Association football clubs disestablished in 2014
2014 disestablishments in Ghana